The 1896 North Carolina gubernatorial election was held on November 3, 1896. Republican nominee Daniel Lindsay Russell defeated Democratic nominee Cyrus B. Watson with 46.52% of the vote. This was the only election in North Carolina between 1872 and 1972 in which the Republican nominee won the governor's office.

Democratic convention
The state Democratic Party convention was held on June 25, 1896.

Candidates 
Cyrus B. Watson, former State Representative and former State Senator
Walter Clark, Associate Justice of the North Carolina Supreme Court
James C. MacRae
Lee Slater Overman, State Representative

Results

Republican convention
The state Republican Party convention was held on May 15, 1896.

Candidates 
Daniel Lindsay Russell, former U.S. Representative
Oliver H. Dockery, former U.S. Representative
James E. Boyd
James M. Moody, State Senator

Results

General election

Candidates
Major party candidates
Daniel Lindsay Russell, Republican
Cyrus B. Watson, Democratic

Other candidates
William A. Guthrie, People's
James R. Jones, National Prohibition
Jeremiah W. Holt, Prohibition

Results

References

1896
North Carolina
Gubernatorial